Henry Martyn Hoyt, Sr. (June 8, 1830 – December 1, 1892) was an American lawyer and politician and the 18th governor of Pennsylvania from 1879 to 1883, as well as an officer in the Union army during the American Civil War.

Early life
Henry M. Hoyt was born in Kingston, Pennsylvania, the son of Ziba Hoyt (b. September 1788, Connecticut – d. December 1853, Luzerne County, PA) and Nancy (née Herbert) Hoyt, who had moved to Luzerne County after the Revolutionary War. Henry M. Hoyt was grandson of Daniel and Ann (Gunn) Hoyt, and nephew of Levi Hoyt. They were descended from Walter Hoyt (1616–1698), who was born in West Hatch, Somerset, England and settled in the Connecticut Colony.

He attended lower education at Wyoming Seminary. He started higher-level classes at Lafayette College, where he studied from 1845 until 1848. He transferred to Williams College, graduating in 1849 with Phi Beta Kappa honors, as a member of The Kappa Alpha Society.

Career
After graduating from Williams College, he returned to Pennsylvania, where from 1851 to 1853 he taught Mathematics at Wyoming Seminary. Hoyt first held elected office as a district attorney. A member of the Whig Party, Hoyt participated in John Fremont's 1856 presidential campaign.

Military career
As a soldier in the Civil War, Hoyt was initially commissioned as Lieutenant Colonel, then as colonel of the 52nd Pennsylvania Infantry. He led it during the Peninsula Campaign and subsequent actions of the Army of the Potomac until January 1863, when the regiment was ordered to Charleston, South Carolina.

He participated in the siege of Morris Island under Brig. Gen. Quincy A. Gillmore. Hoyt led troops in a rare night attack on Fort Johnson, stealthily arriving in the darkness via boats. He initially captured the fort, but was unable to hold it for lack of reinforcements. He and many of his men were captured in a Confederate counterattack. After being confined in a prisoner-of-war camp in Macon, Georgia, Hoyt was taken back to Charleston. He escaped briefly before being recaptured.

Upon his eventual exchange, he rejoined his regiment. He served with them until the close of the war, when he was mustered out with the rank of brevet brigadier general.

Law career
After the war, Hoyt returned to his law practice. After briefly serving as a judge, he rose in influence with the Republican party and chaired the state Republican party from 1875 to 1876.

In 1878, he won the governor's seat, the third consecutive Civil War general to hold the office. During his term, the debt of the state was reduced to $10,000,000, and refunded at the rate of three per cent.

Hoyt wrote two books: Controversy between Connecticut and Pennsylvania (Philadelphia, 1879), about their competing colonial claims settled after the Revolutionary War; and Protection vs. Free Trade (New York, 1885).

Personal life
On September 25, 1855, Hoyt married Mary Elizabeth Loveland (b. April 1833 – d. October 1890 in Luzerne County), the daughter of Elijah and Mary (née Buckingham) Loveland. They had two children together:
Henry Martyn Hoyt, Jr. (1856–1910) became solicitor general
Maud Buckingham Hoyt (1859–1931)

Hoyt died in Wilkes-Barre on December 1, 1892. He is buried next to his wife in the Forty Fort Cemetery in Luzerne County, Pennsylvania.

Descendants
Hoyt was also the grandfather of the poet Elinor Wylie, the daughter of Henry Martyn Hoyt, Jr. His daughter was a poet, too: https://www.poetryfoundation.org/poets/helen-hoyt?mc_cid=b202317e81&mc_eid=15eb358e88

Honors
In 1881 Hoyt was awarded the honorary degree of LL. D. from the University of Pennsylvania and also from Lafayette College.
A residence hall in the South Halls section of the Pennsylvania State University at the University Park campus is named for him.

See also
American Civil War prison camps

Notes

References
State of Pennsylvania official webpage for Governor Hoyt

External links
 

1830 births
1892 deaths
People from Kingston, Pennsylvania
American people of English descent
Pennsylvania Whigs
19th-century American politicians
Pennsylvania Republicans
Governors of Pennsylvania
Republican Party governors of Pennsylvania
Union Army colonels
Pennsylvania state court judges
Pennsylvania lawyers
People of Pennsylvania in the American Civil War
American Civil War prisoners of war
Williams College alumni
Wyoming Seminary alumni
19th-century American judges
19th-century American lawyers